Nicholas Anthony Micozzie (September 7, 1930 – July 28, 2020) was an American politician who served as a Republican member of the Pennsylvania House of Representatives for the 163rd district from 1979 to 2014.

Early life and education
The son of Camillo and Josephine (née Maffei) Micozzie, Nicholas Micozzie was born in Philadelphia, Pennsylvania and graduated from St. Thomas More High School.  He obtained a B.S. in business administration from St. Joseph's College in 1963 and a degree in electrical engineering from Villanova University in 1968.

He served as staff sergeant in the United States Air Force from 1950 to 1954 during the Korean War.

Career
Micozzie worked for General Electric and in real estate.  He was elected commissioner in Upper Darby, Pennsylvania as a Democrat and served from 1971 to 1989.  He switched to the Republican Party in 1978 and was elected to the Pennsylvania House of Representatives for the 163rd district.  He was reelected to seventeen consecutive terms and served until 2014.  He was not a candidate for reelection in 2014.

Personal
Micozzie and his wife had three children, seven grandchildren, and five great-grandchildren. He was the father of former Upper Darby mayor Thomas Micozzie.

Micozzie died on July 28, 2020, following a fall on July 23, 2020.

Legacy
A bridge on Garrett Road in Upper Darby, Pennsylvania was renamed the Honorable Nicholas A. Micozzie Bridge in his honor.

References

1930 births
2020 deaths
20th-century American politicians
21st-century American politicians
United States Air Force personnel of the Korean War
Members of the Pennsylvania House of Representatives
Military personnel from Pennsylvania
Pennsylvania city council members
Pennsylvania Democrats
Pennsylvania Republicans
People from Upper Darby Township, Pennsylvania
Saint Joseph's University alumni
Villanova University alumni